Keezhmadu  is a village located in Aluva, Ernakulam district on the way to Perumbavoor. It can be reached by KSRTC buses or by hiring vehicles. The famous school for the blind is situated there. The famous female singer Minmini was born there.

References 

Villages in Ernakulam district